Ishtam may refer to:

 Ishtam (2001 Malayalam film), directed by Sibi Malayil starring Dileep and Navya Nair
 Ishtam (2001 Telugu film),  directed by Vikram Kumar and Raj Kumar starring Shriya Saran 
 Ishtam (2012 film), Tamil film directed by Prem Nizar, starring Vimal and Nisha Aggarwal